Hayatullah Hayat (born 1974) is a politician in Afghanistan and former Interior Minister. He previously served as Governor of Wardak, Helmand, Nangarhar and Kandahar provinces, and also as the Minister of Rural Rehabilitation and Development. Hayat was appointed as Minister of Interior Affairs in March 2021, replacing Masood Andrabi. He served as Minister of Interior Affairs until 19 June 2021.

References

External links 
Hayatullah Hayat appointed as new governor for Maidan Wardak (Khaama Press, June 9, 2015)

Living people
1973 births